CCNet may refer to:

 CCNET, a 1980s academic computing network
 ccnet.com, an Internet service provider formerly located in Contra Costa County, California
 the .NET version of the CruiseControl continuous integration software package
 Cambridge Conference Network, formerly a discussion group concerning climate change skepticism and other topics